Ibrahim Ibrahim may refer to:

 Ibrahim Ibrahim (bishop) (born 1962), Canadian bishop
 Ibrahim Ibrahim (economist), Qatari economist
 I. M. Ibrahim (1941–2008), head coach of the Clemson University men's soccer team
 Ibrahim Namo Ibrahim (born 1937), bishop of the Catholic Church in the United States
 Ibrahim Sabawi Ibrahim (1981–2015), Saddam Hussein's half-nephew and an ISIL guerrilla